Kat Mon Dieu (born January 3, 1963) is a Marilyn Monroe tribute artist, neo-classical burlesque dancer, pin-up model, art school model, actress, producer, performance artist and writer based in New York. She was the producer of Dark Carnival Burlesque: a monthly show featuring an offbeat combination of burlesque and variety acts. Kat also was a freelance blogger for Dr Sketchy's Anti-Art School

Biography

Kat Mon Dieu was born Julie Snyder in Rochester, New York.

She has lived in Mexico, England and France.

1976 Kat spent the Bicentennial summer in NYC where her father resided while testifying for a court case between Kodak and Polaroid. She was 13 when she first set foot in NYC's playground, Coney Island. She would in later years be an avid participant in the Mermaid Parade as well as perform at the Coney Island Gala and on the Sideshow stage at Coney Island USA. In 2011 she was picked by Bambi the Mermaid, to compete with 11 others for the title of "Miss Coney Island". She is notorious for diving into the seal pool at the New York Aquarium during a performance, while dressed as Marilyn

Kat has modeled for various photographers artistic projects (e.g.: Adrian Buckmaster and Don Spiro among others), most specifically in the pin up genre. Her foray into the world of Burlesque began in 2008 with a Christmas show where she portrayed a Lumberjack wearing nothing but tinsel underneath "his" long johns.

Since then Kat has resurrected her loving homage to Marilyn Monroe in the spirit of Dixie Evans and Kitten DeVille, as a burlesque tribute.

Kat Mon Dieu has been dubbed the Lon Chaney of burlesque for her portrayal of a multitude of characters; old, young, male, female, real, fictional and even animals. Her tagline is "The Gal with Nine Lives and a Thousand Disguises".

Kat became the costumer and creator of masks and Headresses, while performing in a variety of events, including the Jägermeister 100 year Anniversary Event and The Illuminati Ball.

Kat lived in NYC from 1986 to 2019. Currently she lives on an organic farm in the Hudson Valley of New York.

She is semi-retired from performance art, but is working on her book chronicling the three years she lived full-time in her converted schoolbus "Brigantia" in NYC.

Stage appearances and productions
Kat Mon Dieu produced a monthly burlesque and variety show Dark Carnival Burlesque with Gothic Hangman as MC.

She performed as various characters in the Speakeasy Dollhouse, Ziegfeld Midnight Frolic as well as The IlluminatiBall by Cynthia von Buhler 

She wrote as a freelance art session blogger and model for Dr Sketchy's Anti-Art School in New York City.

References

External links
 Dark Carnival Burlesque
 Speakeasy Dollhouse
  Kat Mon Dieu Blog
 Kat Mon Dieu Website

1963 births
People from New York City
American neo-burlesque performers
American female dancers
Dancers from New York (state)
Actresses from New York City
Female models from New York (state)
Living people
21st-century American women